was a professor and researcher of modern Japanese literature at Ritsumeikan University, Kyoto. Graduating from Kwansei Gakuin University in the field of Literature, Kimura became a professor at Ritsumeikan University, then served as Vice President at Ritsumeikan Asia Pacific University and then as President of Poole Gakuin University, Osaka. His main research was about Atsushi Nakajima, a writer at the beginning of the Shōwa period.

Biography
 April 1946, Born in Fukuoka.
 April 1979, Associate Professor, Kumamoto Joshi Daigaku
 March 1984, Visiting Professor at Faculty of Letters, University of Indonesia
 April 1991, Professor Faculty of Letters, Ritsumeikan University Kyoto
 April 2000, Professor and Vice Rector of Student Affairs, Ritsumeikan Asia Pacific University in Beppu
 2000, Doctor in Literature, Ritsumeikan University
 April 2004, Professor at Faculty of Letters, Ritsumeikan University, Kyoto
 April 2005, Dean, Faculty of Letters, Ritsumeikan University
 May 2006, Director of Art Museum, Kyotofuritsu Domotoinsho Bijutsukan
 March 2010, Professor Emeritus, Ritsumeikan University, Kyoto
 April 2010, President of Poole Gakuin University, Osaka 
 August 2014, Professor Emeritus, Poole Gakuin University, Osaka
 April 2015, President, College of Osaka Seikei

Books
 "Aki yoru no dokushoki", Musashino Shobo Publishing Co., 1984
 "Nakajima Atsushiron", Sobunsha Pub. Co. 1986
 "Mo hitotsu no bungakushi` Senso 'e no manazashi", Zoshinkai Shuppansha Pub. Co. 1996
 "Showa sakka no <Minami Hiroyuki>", Sekai Shiso-sha Pub. Co. 2004
 "Fuan ni ikiru bungakushi Ogai Mori kara Nakagami Kenji made", Sobunsha Pub. Co. 2008

References 

Japanese scientists
1946 births
2015 deaths
Kwansei Gakuin University alumni